Franz Fäh (born 22 November 1937) is a Swiss gymnast. He competed in eight events at the 1964 Summer Olympics.

References

1937 births
Living people
Swiss male artistic gymnasts
Olympic gymnasts of Switzerland
Gymnasts at the 1964 Summer Olympics
Place of birth missing (living people)
20th-century Swiss people